This is a complete list of the operas of the Italian composer Amilcare Ponchielli (1834–1886).

References
Sources
Budden, Julien (1992), 'Ponchielli, Amilcare' in The New Grove Dictionary of Opera, ed. Stanley Sadie (London) 

Lists of operas by composer
 
Lists of compositions by composer